The 1983 Virginia Slims Hall of Fame Classic, also known as the Virginia Slims of Newport, was a women's tennis tournament played on outdoor grass courts in Newport, Rhode Island in the United States that was part of the 1983 Virginia Slims World Championship Series. The tournament was held from July 11 through July 17, 1983. Third-seeded Alycia Moulton won the singles title.

Finals

Singles
 Alycia Moulton defeated  Kim Shaefer 6–3, 6–2
It was Moulton's 3rd title of the year and the 4th of her career.

Doubles
 Barbara Potter /  Pam Shriver defeated  Barbara Jordan /  Elizabeth Smylie 6–3 6–1
It was Potter's 1st title of the year and the 7th of her career. It was Shriver's 9th title of the year and the 43rd of her career.

References

External links
 International Tennis Federation (ITF) tournament edition details

Edgbaston Cup
Virginia Slims of Newport
1983 in sports in Rhode Island